is a Japanese cinematographer. His work has mostly been in the action genre, but his first feature film was as an assistant on The Pornographers by Shohei Imamura. He worked on early Takashi Miike straight-to-video films such as Lady Hunter and A Human Murder Weapon, and then resumed working with Imamura as chief cinematographer for some of his last films such as Unagi and Dr. Akagi. He also did the cinematography for the 2013 TV series Neko Zamurai starring Kazuki Kitamura.

Awards
He received a Japan Film Technical Award (Nihon Eiga Gijutsushō) from the Motion Picture and Television Engineering Society of Japan for the cinematography for Unagi in 1997, and won the Japan Movie Critics Award for best cinematography in 2008 for Koi suru tomato.

Filmography

References

External links

Japanese cinematographers
1949 births
Living people